STS-78 was the fifth dedicated Life and Microgravity Spacelab mission for the Space Shuttle program, flown partly in preparation for the International Space Station project. The mission used the Space Shuttle Columbia, which lifted off successfully from Kennedy Space Center's Launch Pad 39B on June 20, 1996. This marked the 78th flight of the Space Shuttle and 20th mission for Columbia.

Crew

Backup crew

Mission objectives

 Research into the effects of long – duration spaceflight on human physiology in preparation for flights on the International Space Station.
 22 life science and microgravity experiments using the Orbiter's pressurised Life & Microgravity Spacelab module (LM2).
 Tests into the use of the Orbiter's Reaction Control System jets to raise the altitude of orbiting satellites.

Mission highlights

During the 16-day, 21-hour mission, the crew of Columbia assisted in the preparations for the International Space Station by studying the effects of long-duration spaceflight on the human body in readiness for ISS Expeditions, and also carried out experiments similar to those now being carried out on the orbital station.

Not only did these experiments make use of the module's laboratory, but also employed lockers in the middeck section of the orbiter. Thirteen of the experiments were dedicated to studying the effects of microgravity on the human body, whilst another six studied the behaviour of fluids and metals in the almost weightless environment and the production of metallic alloys and protein crystals. The crew also carried out the first ever comprehensive study of sleep patterns in microgravity, research into bone and muscle loss in space, and in-flight fixes to problem hardware on the Bubble, Drop and Particle Unit (BDPU), designed to study fluid physics.

The mission also featured a test of a procedure that was later used during the second Hubble Space Telescope servicing mission to raise the telescope's altitude without damaging the satellite's solar arrays. During the test, Columbia's vernier Reaction Control System jets were gently pulsed to boost the Shuttle's altitude without jarring any of the mission payloads. The test was successful, and was later employed by Discovery during STS-82, and was used multiple times to boost the orbit of the ISS when docked with an orbiter.

Mission anomaly 
Although the launch went without any issue, an issue was discovered with the SRB's following recovery. Analysis showed worrying damage to the field joints which was likely caused by hot gases. This similar damage is what caused booster seals abord Space Shuttle Challenger to break resulting in a break-up mid-flight. The issue did not compromise astronaut safety because there was a hot gas path through the motors field joint but not the capture joint. Despite there being no issue with safety, it did raise questions of a new EPA required cleaning fluid.

Due to the issue, STS-79 which was meant to dock with the Space Station Mir and return astronaut Shannon Lucid, was delayed. Options of returning Shannon on a Soyuz were considered, but never followed through as the Shuttle was considered safe and able to return Shannon.

See also

List of human spaceflights
List of Space Shuttle missions
Outline of space science
STS-80 (17 day 8 hour Shuttle mission)
STS-67 (16 days 15 hour Shuttle mission)
STS-73 (15 days 21 hours Shuttle mission)

References

External links
 NASA mission summary 
 STS-78 Video Highlights 

Spacecraft launched in 1996
STS-078